Raffaele Nasi (20 October 1909 – 8 May 1986) was an Italian cross-country skier. He competed in the men's 18 kilometre event at the 1936 Winter Olympics.

References

External links
 

1909 births
1986 deaths
Italian male cross-country skiers
Olympic cross-country skiers of Italy
Cross-country skiers at the 1936 Winter Olympics